Kerewo is a Papuan language of southern Papua New Guinea.

Some portions of the Bible were translated into Kerewo.  The Gospels of Matthew, Mark, Luke and JOhn and the Epistles of Ephesians, Philippians and 1 John were translated as  "Nouri buka nou'a airoa" and published in the Goaribari dialect of Kerewo in 1941.

References

Kiwaian languages
Languages of Gulf Province